Cupid's Inspiration are a British pop group, active with various line up changes since 1968 when they had two hit singles. The band are currently on the road with original drummer Roger Gray re-joining the veteran line up of Paul Shanahan and Bob Poole with Paul Thomas on vocals.

Career
Originally from Stamford, Lincolnshire, the band were at first called The Ends (no relation to The End).

The group scored two Top 40 hits on the UK Singles Chart in 1968. "Yesterday Has Gone", originally a hit for Little Anthony and The Imperials, reached No. 4 in July of that year, and "My World" went to No. 33 in October. In 1970, lead singer Terry Rice-Milton the vocalist on the hit singles left, replaced by John Lynch and then Martin Cure, who added several musicians from Leamington to the line-up so none of the hit making band remained after these changes.
 
Rice-Milton had his third hit with "You're my World" in 1970 (a song that had previously been a hit for Cilla Black), while bass player Gordon Haskell later joined King Crimson.

By 1978, the band began writing and recording heavier rock songs.  These were performed under a different name, initially '4 Wheel Drive', which they soon changed to 'Chevy', to avoid alienating Cupid's Inspiration fans. They recruited Steve Walwyn, later of Dr. Feelgood to give a "twin guitar" sound.  As 'Chevy' they toured supporting bands such as Alvin Lee, Hawkwind and Gillan. Chevy recorded two BBC In Concert Programmes, issued three singles: "Too Much Loving" / "See the Light", "The Taker" / "Life on the Run" and "Just Another Day" / "Rock On" and one album The Taker, released in September 1980.

In the 1990s and early 2000s, some of the original group played reunion shows with other bands from the era.

In 2010, Bob Poole returned from 18 years in Germany and together with Paul Shanahan, ex Peppermint Circus vocalist Paul Thomas, and ex Ben E King and Barbara Dickinson drummer Rick Medlock reformed Cupid's Inspiration later replacing Rick Medlock with Roger Gray, the original band drummer who played on all the records who had left in 1972.

In September 2012, founder members Terry Rice-Milton and Laughton James, together with Bernie Lee, who was a member during 1968/69, and drummer Tony Peck from The Ends played a reunion concert in their home town of Stamford, which they are hoping to repeat in 2014.

The band's hit single, featuring Terry-Rice Milton, "Yesterday Has Gone" (written by Teddy Randazzo and Victoria Pike) has featured on many compilation albums, including Sixties Power Ballads - The Greatest Driving Anthems in the World... Ever! (2007) as well as their original album Yesterday Has Gone (1969).

Members
Terry Rice-Milton (born Terence Bull, 5 June 1946, Stamford, Lincolnshire - lead vocals (to 1970)
Laughton James (born James Laughton, 21 December 1946, Stamford, Lincolnshire) - bass guitarist (to October 1968)
Garfield Tonkin (born John Sharpe, 28 September 1946, Stamford, Lincolnshire) - keyboards (to 1969)
Wyndham George (born Geoffrey Wyndham Hart, 20 February 1947, Stamford, Lincolnshire) - guitar (to October 1968)
Bernie Lee (born July 1943, North Wales) - lead guitar (October 1968 to 1970) (ex-Umbrella)
Gordon Haskell (born Gordon Hionides, 27 April 1946, Verwood, Dorset, England) - bass (October 1968 to 1969)
Roger Gray (born 29 April 1947, Stamford) - drums (to 1972 and 2014)
David Morris (London) - electronic organ (1969 onwards)
Derek Needham (born 10 October 1945, London) - bass (1969–71)
Martin Cure - lead vocals (1970 to 2008)
Paul Shanahan - lead guitar/vocals (1970 to 1985 and 2010 to 2014)
Jim Batty - guitar (1985 to 2008)
Bob Poole - bass guitar/vocals (1970 to 1985 and 2010 to 2014)
Andy Chaplin - drums (1970 to 1981)
Eamonn Carr - guitar/vocals (1972)
Paul Brooke - drums (1981 to 2008)
Keith Hancock - bass (1987 to 2008)
Ted Duggan - drums (1987 to 2008)
Paul Thomas - vocals (2010 to 2014)
Kevan Towning (2017 to present) 
Barry Scott (2017 to present)
Rick Medlock - drums (2010 to 2013)

References

External links
 The original Cupid's Inspiration, Featuring Terry Rice-Milton
 Cupids Inspiration official web site
 laughton james cupids inspiration history site.

English rock music groups
Music in Lincolnshire
Stamford, Lincolnshire